USS Cummings has been the name of more than one United States Navy ship, and may refer to:

 , a Cassin-class destroyer in commission from 1913 to 1934
 , a Mahan-class destroyer in commission from 1935 to 1947

See also

 , a Cannon-class destroyer escort cancelled in 1943
 , a Buckley-class destroyer escort in commission from 1944 to 1947

United States Navy ship names